The Republic of the Congo is located in the western part of central Africa. Situated on the Equator, it is bordered by the Angolan exclave of Cabinda to the south (231 km), the Democratic Republic of the Congo to the north and east (1,229 km), the Central African Republic (487 km) and Cameroon (494 km) to the north and Gabon to the west (2,567 km). Congo has a 169 km long Atlantic coast with several important ports. The Republic of the Congo covers an area of 342,000 km², of which 341,500 km² is land while 500 km² is water. Congo claims  of territorial sea.

The capital of the Republic of the Congo is Brazzaville, located on the Congo River immediately across from Kinshasa, capital of the Democratic Republic of the Congo. With a metropolitan population of approximately 1.5 million, Brazzaville is by far the largest city in the Republic, having almost twice the population of Pointe-Noire (663,400 as of the 2005 census), the country's second largest city. About 70% of the population lives in Brazzaville, Pointe-Noire, or along the railroad between them.

Environment

Climate 
Congo is a tropical nation, which means it has a tropical climate. The wet season lasts from March to June and the dry season for the rest of the year. Temperature and humidity are high as in all tropical nations. The rivers of the country are flooded seasonally.

Ecology 
The terrain is a variation of coastal plains, mountainous regions, plateaus and fertile valleys. About 70 percent of the country's area is covered by rain forest. The highest point, at 1,020 m, is Mont Nabeba in the Mayumbe mountains. The major rivers are the Congo River at the border with the Democratic Republic of the Congo, and the Kouilou-Niari River.

A 2014 expedition leaving from Itanga village discovered a peat bog "as big as England" which stretches into neighboring Democratic Republic of Congo.

UNESCO has declared two world biosphere reserves in the country: Odzala in 1977 and Dimonika in 1988.

Natural resources 

Natural resources include petroleum, timber, potash, lead, zinc, uranium, copper, phosphates, gold, magnesium, natural gas, and hydropower.

As of a 2012 estimate, 1.55% of the land is arable, while only 0.20% contains permanent crops. Approximately 20 km² is irrigated (2003 estimation).

Environmental issues 

Environmental issues include the high level of air pollution from vehicle emissions, water pollution from the dumping of raw sewage, tap water not being potable, and deforestation.

Congo is party to the international agreements on Biodiversity, Climate Change, Desertification, Endangered Species, Ozone Layer Protection, Tropical Timber 83, Tropical Timber 94, Wetlands. It has signed but not ratified the Law of the Sea and so on.

Extreme points 

This is a list of the extreme points of the Republic of Congo, i.e. the points that are farther north, south, east, or west than any other location.

Northernmost point - unnamed location on the border with Central African Republic immediately south-west of the CAR town of Madoukou, Likouala department
Easternmost point - Motenge-Bom, Likouala department
Southernmost point - unnamed headland near the point at which the Congo-Cabinda border enters the Atlantic Ocean, Kouilou department
Westernmost point - the point at which the border with Gabon enters the Atlantic Ocean, Kouilou department

Notes

References

See also 

 Geology in the Republic of the Congo

 

pt:Congo#Geografia